Diane is a 2018 American drama film written and directed by Kent Jones. The film stars Mary Kay Place, Jake Lacy, Deirdre O'Connell, Andrea Martin and Estelle Parsons. For her performance in the film, Place won the Los Angeles Film Critics Association Award for Best Actress and the National Society of Film Critics Award for Best Actress.

It had its world premiere at the Tribeca Film Festival on April 22, 2018. It was released on March 29, 2019, by IFC Films.

Plot
Diane Rhodes is a sixtysomething widow living in Pittsfield, Massachusetts whose days are taken up through service to others. She makes a to-do list for her day, before delivering a casserole to friends, one of whom is recovering from a recent accident. She makes a brief stop to pick a teacher friend from school before delivering clean clothes to her adult son Brian. Brian, a heroin addict and alcoholic, lives in squalor with his likewise addict girlfriend Carla.

When Diane arrives at Brian’s apartment, to which she has a key, she finds him passed out on the couch. She wakes him and they proceed to argue about his sobriety. He claims to be suffering from bronchitis and is angered at Diane’s insinuation that he is not sober and needs to go back to the hospital where he detoxed. After she leaves, Diane visits her cousin Donna, who is in the hospital suffering from advanced cervical cancer. Donna is asleep when she arrives and Diane engages in banal conversations with the nursing staff.

The next days pass similarly, with Diane visiting Brian and Donna in succession. Brian continues to object to his mother’s visits, while Donna rejects her nurses’ offer of morphine and instead engages in playing gin rummy with Diane. After Donna’s pain increases, Diane calls her aunt Madge, who a neighbor drives to the hospital. Donna is visibly soothed by her mother’s presence.

Diane drives Madge to a family gathering with her aunts and uncles. After a tense exchange with her eldest aunt Ina, her aunt Mary tells a story about an encyclopedia salesman. Diane goes to dinner at a buffet restaurant with her best friend Bobbie. They have a conversation about how many people their age are dying.

Diane volunteers at a soup kitchen, where one of her favorite regulars, Tom, engages her in friendly conversation. Diane shows herself to have close familiarity with the layout of the kitchen and how much food should be out at any one time. When the power goes out, Diane and the other workers bring lit candles to the tables so the people can eat in peace.

During Diane’s visits, Brian begins to visibly worsen. On one of her last visits, she finds him passed out in the bathroom and turns the shower on to shock him awake. She angrily tells him that he has to go back to the hospital and he lashes out verbally. Diane slaps him and leaves. At a subsequent dinner with Bobbie, she angrily states how tired she is of everyone talking about Brian, including her. Bobbie distracts her by talking about the history of the buffet restaurant they are eating at and how terrible the food is, which makes Diane laugh. When a server arrives at their table, Diane lies about how much they are enjoying the food.

While visiting Donna, Diane has an uncomfortable conversation with her about an incident in 1999 when their family was visiting Cape Cod when Diane left Brian and her husband at the family home and took off with Donna’s boyfriend, Jess. Diane asks Donna if she has forgiven Diane. Donna pointedly says, “I’ve forgiven you, but I haven’t forgotten,” and tells Diane how much it hurt for her to take care of Brian while Diane left with Jess. Diane takes her coat and leaves.
Diane visits Brian’s apartment to find out he has disappeared. She searches for him and calls his phone to no avail. She visits on several subsequent days, but he does not reappear.

On a night where Diane works at the soup kitchen, Tom is reprimanded by another worker for attempting to go through the serving line a third time. Diane intervenes, tells Tom to get as much food as he wants, and upbraids the other worker, yelling at her about how she has no right to humiliate people just because they are poor. Bobbie pulls Diane into a side room and tells her that she must get some peace. As Diane struggles to regain her composure, Bobbie gently tells her to take as much time as she needs “and come out when you’re good and ready.”

After once again visiting Brian’s empty apartment, Diane goes to a bar where she used to be a regular. She drinks margaritas and listens to the jukebox. After she becomes visibly intoxicated, the waitress cuts her off while the bartender makes a phone call. Diane exits the bar, collapses, and begins sobbing. Her aunts and friends arrive to drive her home.

Diane receives a call that Donna is dying and rushes to the hospital. As she enters the room to see her family quietly watching Donna in her last moments, her phone rings. She realizes it is Brian and steps into the hall to answer it. When she verifies that he is fine, she goes back into the hospital room, where Donna has now died. Madge hugs Diane and tells her that Donna loved her, which makes Diane break down.

Diane meets Brian at a small restaurant where he is far more put together and coherent. He tells her that he had to get help himself and that he went to a facility on Cape Cod to do so. Diane initially says that she has something to tell him, but when she is interrupted by the waitress bringing coffee, she changes her mind and tells Brian she will tell him about it later.

An indeterminate amount of time passes. Diane attends a service at a Pentecostal church, visibly uncomfortable in the open worship going on. At the front of the service, Brian, now wearing a wedding ring, assists in a trust fall exercise.

During a conversation with Jennifer, a manicurist, Diane talks about how all her aunts have died except Ina, the eldest. Jennifer discusses how she knows Diane’s daughter-in-law Tally and they show mutual disapproval at the depth and fervor of Tally and Brian’s faith. When Jennifer asks Diane if she is getting her nails done to attend an aunt’s funeral, Diane hesitates before saying she is going to funeral of a good friend who loved getting her nails done. Bobbie’s funeral is briefly shown.

Diane visits Brian and Tally to have lunch. As she brings in grocery bags and starts cooking, she hears them openly praying about her. At lunch, they begin to discuss whether Diane will join their church. She is visibly uncomfortable and tries to change the subject. As they persist, she becomes increasingly irritated and finally angry, lashing out at Brian for his selfishness. He turns the accusation back on her, reminding her of how she left him when she took off with Jess. Diane leaves.

Diane begins writing confessional poetry, seemingly inspired by the work of Emily Dickinson, which she keeps by her bedside. She has a vivid dream in which Jess appears and injects her with heroin, though a later journal entry states that Jess appeared much kinder in her dream than he was in real life. While shopping for groceries, Diane sees the former co-worker at the soup kitchen. They pointedly avoid each other. When a call from Brian comes in, Diane declines to answer.

Diane has a conversation with Ina about how she doesn’t know how to cope with Brian’s religiosity. Ina tells her of a friend who substituted religion for alcohol – one addiction for another. She reassures Diane that Brian will come around.

Diane is briefly seen attending Ina’s funeral. When cleaning up the soup kitchen one night, Diane accidentally drops a dirty pan in the kitchen. Tom comes in to help her clean up. Diane apologizes repeatedly, but Tom insists on her sitting down while he cleans. As he does so, he tells Diane how she reminds him of one of his aunts, who apologized for everything, thinking she could never atone for some imagined sin. Diane, barely keeping tears at bay, tells him how she has caused a great deal of pain. He finishes cleaning and tells her that when she serves him food, he feels salvation.

Late one night, Brian arrives at Diane’s, intoxicated. He bitterly discusses his unhappiness in his marriage and apologizes for his cruelty to his mother. When she tells him how she cannot forgive herself for leaving him, he tells her that he was never truly angry with her and that he forced himself into feeling anger toward her because he felt he should. They reconcile before Brian leaves, wryly telling Diane he has to go “back to Jesusland.” Diane prepares to go to bed, turning off the light for a moment before turning it back on and pulling her to-do list out, adding more entries to it.

In the film’s final scene, a visibly older Diane stands outside, filling bird feeders in the snow. As she lifts the bag of birdseed and prepares to go back inside, she pauses, her mind racing with thoughts about what she has to do. She quickly becomes confused and is unable to latch onto a single thought. She collapses into the snow as a woman offscreen calls her name and runs up to her. Diane closes her eyes.

Cast

Release
The film premiered at the Tribeca Film Festival on April 22, 2018. On August 2, 2018, IFC Films acquired distribution rights to the film. It was released on March 29, 2019.

Critical reception 
On review aggregate website Rotten Tomatoes, Diane has an approval rating of 93% based on 99 reviews. The site's consensus states, "A small-scale drama rich with meaning, Diane offers audiences an uncommonly empathetic and wise look at life -- and stellar work from Mary Kay Place in the title role." 

Widespread praise was given to Place's performance. Justin Chang of the Los Angeles Times wrote, "What looks at first like a solid, well-carpentered exercise in downbeat indie realism ends up, by dint of its unexpected tonal and temporal leaps and sudden formal ruptures, in less easily definable territory." Ella Taylor of NPR said, "[Kent] Jones fills [Diane's] existential space with a bracing, though never unfeeling, inquiry into what it feels like to confront the steady drip of accumulating pain, and loss, and no longer being needed as we age."

Awards and nominations

References

External links
 
 Diane  at AllMovie
 Diane at IFC Films

2018 films
2018 drama films
American drama films
2010s English-language films
Films about drugs
Films about dysfunctional families
Films about evangelicalism
Films about grieving
Films about old age
Films about parenting
Films set in Massachusetts
IFC Films films
Films directed by Kent Jones
2010s American films
2018 independent films
American independent films